Ekspress-AM33 (meaning Express-AM33) is a Russian domestic communications satellite. It belongs to the Russian Satellite Communications Company (RSCC) based in Moscow, Russia. To provide of communications services (digital television, telephony, videoconferencing, data transmission, the Internet access, presidential and governmental mobile communications) and to deploy satellite networks by applying Very-small-aperture terminal (VSAT) technology to Russia, Kazakhstan, Mongolia, China, and the Middle East.

Satellite description 
The satellite has a total of 17 transponders, was 10 C-band, 6 Ku-band and 1 L-band transponders. The Ekspress-AM33 Russian domestic communications satellite, built by Information Satellite Systems Reshetnev (NPO PM) for Kosmicheskaya Svyaz. The communications payload was built by the French company Thales Alenia Space.

Launch 
Ekspress-AM33 was launched by Khrunichev State Research and Production Space Center, using a Proton-M / Briz-M launch vehicle. The launch took place at 00:18:00 UTC on 28 January 2008, from Site 200/39 at Baikonur Cosmodrome, Kazakhstan. Successfully deployed into geostationary transfer orbit (GTO), Ekspress-AM33 raised itself into an operational geostationary orbit using its apogee motor.

Mission 
Express-AM33 was launched into orbit on 28 January 2008. The commercial operation of the satellite started on 14 April 2008. The Ekspress-103 satellite entered in service at orbital position 96.5° East on 25 March 2021, where it replaced Ekspress-AM33.

References 

Ekspress satellites
Spacecraft launched in 2008
2008 in Russia
Satellites using the KAUR bus